Mogpog , officially the Municipality of Mogpog (Tagalog: Bayan ng Mogpog)  is a 3rd class municipality in the province of Marinduque, Philippines. According to the 2020 census, it has a population of 34,516 people.

History
In 1942, the Japanese troops occupied the town of Mogpog.

In 1945, during the Second World War, at the liberation of the town of Mogpog, American and Filipino troops fought against the Japanese Imperial forces during the Battle of Marinduque.

Historically, the famous Moriones Festival is said to have originated from Mogpog. Moriones Festival was founded by a Spanish friar, Rev. Father Dionisio Santiago, the first parish priest of Mogpog.  This festival is known to be one of the most colorful festivals in Marinduque and the Philippines. It is held in Mogpog and the surrounding areas of Marinduque island.

Geography

Barangays
Mogpog is politically subdivided into 37 barangays. Hinanggayon was formerly a sitio of barrio (barangay) Argao; in 1954 it was elevated as a barrio.

The town center or poblacion comprises the barangays of Dulong Bayan, Gitnang Bayan, Market Site, Mataas na Bayan, and Villa Mendez with possible expansion to barangays of Janagdong and Nangka I.

Climate

Demographics

Economy

Landmarks

Barangay Balanacan is where the main shipping port is located. It is famous for its large image of Our Lady of Biglang Awa, erected at a top of a shed on a mound of land overlooking the sea.

Not far from the Academy is the town plaza, located at the side right of Marinduque Academy's Main Building, with a great view of a local park, the Municipal Building, and the Trial Court - all of which covers the town public market.

Education

Secondary
Argao National High School
Balanacan National High School
Butansapa National High School
Marinduque Academy (Barangay Gitnang Bayan)
Mogpog NCHS
Sayao National High School
Quezon-Roxaz High School (poblacion)
 Puting Buhangin National High School

Primary

Notable personalities

Ricardo Jamin Cardinal Vidal, Archbishop emeritus of Cebu was born February 6, 1931, in Mogpog.

Sister cities
  Makati, Philippines

References

External links

[ Philippine Standard Geographic Code]

Philippines census info
Local Governance Performance Management System

Municipalities of Marinduque